Moulon is the name of several communes in France:

 Moulon, Gironde, in the Gironde department
 Moulon, Loiret, in the Loiret department

Other uses
Moulin (grape), another name for the wine grape Chardonnay